Bromus intermedius, the intermediate brome, is a species of flowering plant in the family Poaceae. It is native to the Mediterranean countries and islands, and eastwards to Afghanistan. It can be found growing on serpentine soils.

References

intermedius
Flora of North Africa
Flora of Europe
Flora of Western Asia
Plants described in 1827